Jordan Seabrook (born June 27, 1987 in Indianapolis, Indiana) is an American soccer player.

Career

College and amateur
Seabrook attended North Central High School in Indianapolis, IN, and played college soccer at the University of South Florida, where he was 1 four-time All Big East selection, and helped his team to the 2005 Regular Season Championship, the 2008 Big East Tournament Championship, and three NCAA Tournament qualifications in 2005, 2007 and 2008.

During his college years Seabrook also played with Bradenton Academics in the USL Premier Development League.

Professional
Seabrook took part in the 2009 adidas MLS Player Combine, and was selected the fourth round (51st overall) of the 2009 MLS SuperDraft by Colorado Rapids, but was ultimately not offered a developmental contract by the club.

Instead, he signed with Crystal Palace Baltimore in the USL Second Division; he made his professional debut on April 17, 2009 in Baltimore's season opening 0-0 tie with the Pittsburgh Riverhounds, and went on to make 20 appearances and score three goals in his debut season.  On March 16, 2010, Baltimore announced the re-signing of Seabrook to a new contract for the 2010 season.

Career statistics
(correct as of May 20, 2010)''

References

External links
 Crystal Palace Baltimore bio
 USF bio
 

American soccer players
Living people
1987 births
USL Second Division players
South Florida Bulls men's soccer players
IMG Academy Bradenton players
Crystal Palace Baltimore players
Penn FC players
USSF Division 2 Professional League players
USL League Two players
USL Championship players
United States men's under-20 international soccer players
FC Haka players
Colorado Rapids draft picks
Soccer players from Indianapolis
Vaasan Palloseura players
Ettan Fotboll players
Veikkausliiga players
American expatriate soccer players
Expatriate footballers in Sweden
Expatriate footballers in Finland
American expatriate sportspeople in Finland
Association football wingers
American expatriate sportspeople in Sweden